Baam Shahrekord Football Club is an Iranian football club based in Shahrekord, Iran. They competed in the 2010–11 Iran Football's 2nd Division.

Season-by-Season

The table below shows the achievements of the club in various competitions.

See also
 Hazfi Cup

Football clubs in Iran
Association football clubs established in 2009
2009 establishments in Iran